Sofia Kokkali (Greek: Σοφία Κόκκαλη; Athens, 1988) is a Greek actress. Her film credits include Little England and Thread.

Filmography

References

External links

Greek film actresses
Living people
Actresses from Athens
1988 births